Pleasant Lawn Cemetery is a historic cemetery located at Parish in Oswego County, New York.  It was first used as a burial ground in 1814 and formally incorporated in 1871.  Within the boundaries of this contributing site are three contributing buildings; a 19th-century receiving vault, the Mills-Petrie Mausoleum of 1899, and the Mills-Petrie Chapel of 1917.  The earliest gravestones date from 1825.

It was listed on the National Register of Historic Places in 2005.

US Representative Hadwen C. Fuller (1895–1990) is buried there.

References

External links
 
 

Cemeteries on the National Register of Historic Places in New York (state)
Cemeteries in Oswego County, New York
National Register of Historic Places in Oswego County, New York